CYSNERGY S.L. is an engineering and consulting company founded in 2011 by the industrial engineer Vicente Rodilla, whose main activities are focused around the field of electrical efficiency.

The company is settled in Paterna, Spain. The company is located in the Science Park of the University of Valencia and has international patents for the design and installation of their monitoring systems and electrical modeling according to the ISO 50001 on Energy Management.

CYSNERGY is the only Spanish company that was selected by the European Commission, Phase 1 and 2, within the Horizon program 2020, in the field of Energy Efficiency. CYSNERGY was selected by Enertic Awards and Fundación Repsol contents, as finalist in theirs sections of Energetic Efficiency due to its project EFICONSUMPTION, in 2015.

The methodology of CYSNERGY is officially recommended since 2000, by the Spanish General Department of Energy Planning. Other public bodies that have collaborated with CYSNERGY doing research, development and innovation are ENISA (Empresa Nacional de Innovación), CDTI (Centro para el desarrollo Tecnológico Industrial), IVACE (Instituto Valenciano de Competitividad Empresarial), OEPM (Oficina Española de Patentes y Marcas), etc.

The main markets where the company operates are Spain, Central America and South America. Besides that CYSNERGY has already made exports to Brazil and Russia.

References

External links
 Página web oficial

See also 
 ISO 50001

Engineering companies of Spain
Electrical engineering companies
Paterna